Marek Lemsalu (born 24 November 1972) is an Estonian former professional footballer. He played as a centre-back for Pärnu KEK, Sport Tallinn, Pärnu Kalakombinaat/MEK, Flora, Mainz 05, Kuressaare, Strømsgodset, Tulevik, Start, Bryne and Levadia.

Lemsalu made his debut for the Estonia national team in 1992. He was captain in 1995 and 1996, and made a total of 86 appearances for the team before retiring in 2007.

Lemsalu was named Estonian Footballer of the Year in 1996 and Meistriliiga Player of the Year in 2006.

Club career

Early career
Lemsalu started playing football in 1988 for his hometown club Pärnu KEK, before moving to Soviet Second League club Sport Tallinn in 1989. In 1990, he returned to Pärnu where he played for Pärnu Kalakombinaat/MEK.

Flora
In 1992, Lemsalu signed for Flora of the newly formed Meistriliiga. With Flora, he won four Meistriliiga titles, in 1993–94, 1994–95, 1997–98, and 1998. In December 1997 he had a trial at English club Barnsley who were then in the Premier League, however this didn't lead to a transfer.

Mainz 05 (loan)
In 1996, Lemsalu joined German 2. Bundesliga side Mainz 05 on a season-long loan for a fee of EEK 1 million.

Strømsgodset
In 1999, Lemsalu signed for Norwegian Tippeligaen side Strømsgodset.

Tulevik
In 2000, Lemsalu returned to Estonia and joined Tulevik.

Start
In 2001, Lemsalu signed for Norwegian 1. divisjon side Start. He helped Start to finish the 2001 season as runners-up and earn their promotion to the Tippeligaen.

Bryne
On 11 December 2002, Lemsalu signed a three-year contract with Norwegian Tippeligaen side Bryne.

Levadia
On 17 January 2006, Lemsalu returned to the Meistriliiga, joining Levadia. Levadia reached the first round in the 2006–07 UEFA Cup, but lost to Newcastle United 1–3 on aggregate. In 2006, Lemsalu succeeded Konstantin Vassiljev as team captain. He won the 2006 Meistriliiga title and was named Meistriliiga Player of the Year. He won two more successive Meistriliiga titles in 2007 and 2008. Lemsalu retired from professional football after the 2008 season, playing his last match on 15 November 2008 against TVMK.

International career
Lemsalu made his international debut for the Estonia national team on 11 July 1992 in a 1–1 draw against Lithuania in the 1992 Baltic Cup. He was team captain in 1995 and 1996. He scored his first goal for Estonia on 22 June 1997 in a 4–1 home win against Andorra in a friendly. Lemsalu retired from international football on 28 March 2007, after a UEFA Euro 2008 qualifying match against Israel. He made a total of 86 appearances and scored 3 goals.

Personal life
Lemsalu's daughter Liis Lemsalu is a singer and the winner of the fourth season of Eesti otsib superstaari (Estonian version of Idols).

Career statistics

Club

International

International goals
Estonia score listed first, score column indicates score after each Lemsalu goal.

Honours

Club
Pärnu Kalakombinaat/MEK
 Estonian Cup: 1990

Flora
 Meistriliiga: 1993–94, 1994–95, 1997–98, 1998
 Estonian Cup: 1994–95

Levadia
 Meistriliiga: 2006, 2007, 2008
 Estonian Cup: 2006–07

Individual
 Estonian Footballer of the Year: 1996
 Meistriliiga Player of the Year: 2006

References

External links
 
  

1972 births
Living people
Sportspeople from Pärnu
Soviet footballers
Estonian footballers
Estonia international footballers
FC Flora players
Meistriliiga players
Esiliiga players
1. FSV Mainz 05 players
Viljandi JK Tulevik players
FCI Levadia Tallinn players
Strømsgodset Toppfotball players
Bryne FK players
IK Start players
FC Kuressaare players
2. Bundesliga players
Estonian expatriate footballers
Expatriate footballers in Germany
Estonian expatriate sportspeople in Germany
Expatriate footballers in Norway
Estonian expatriate sportspeople in Norway
Eliteserien players
Norwegian First Division players
Association football defenders